Events from the year 1887 in France.

Incumbents
President: Jules Grévy (until 12 December), Marie François Sadi Carnot (starting 12 December)
President of the Council of Ministers: 
 until 30 May: René Goblet 
 30 May-12 December: Maurice Rouvier
 starting 12 December: Pierre Tirard

Events
 28 January – Construction of foundation of the Eiffel Tower starts in Paris. On 1 July, work on the iron superstructure begins.
 11 January – Louis Pasteur's anti-rabies treatment is defended in the French Academy of Medicine by Dr. Joseph Grancher.
 21–28 April – Schnaebele incident nearly leads to war between France and Germany.
 23 February – The French Riviera is hit by a large earthquake, killing around 2,000 along the coast of the Mediterranean Sea.
 The Lebel Model 1886 rifle is first issued to the French army, the first military firearm to use smokeless powder ammunition.

Births

January to June
 17 January – Marcel Godivier, cyclist (died 1963)
 18 March – Alfred Vaucher, theologian, church historian and bibliographer (died 1993)
 16 April – Paul Marie André Richaud, Cardinal (died 1968)
 31 May – Saint-John Perse, poet and diplomat, awarded the Nobel Prize for Literature in 1960 (died 1975)
 13 June – André François-Poncet, politician and diplomat (died 1978)

July to December
 2 July – Marcel Tabuteau, oboist (died 1966)
 28 July – Marcel Duchamp, artist (died 1968)
 16 September – Nadia Boulanger, composer and conductor (died 1979)
 30 September – Joseph de Goislard de Monsabert, General (died 1981)
 5 October – René Cassin, jurist and judge, received the Nobel Peace Prize in 1968 (died 1976)
 11 October – Pierre Jean Jouve, writer, novelist and poet (died 1976)
 13 November – Jean de Limur, film director (died 1976)
 31 December – Gaston Modot, actor (died 1970)

Deaths
 2 August – Joseph-Louis Lambot, inventor of ferro-cement (born 1814)
 14 August – Jules Pasdeloup, conductor (born 1819)
 20 August – Jules Laforgue, poet (born 1860)
 21 October – Bernard Jauréguiberry, Admiral and statesman (born 1815)

Full date unknown
 Jules Desnoyers, geologist and archaeologist (born 1800)
 Honoré Jacquinot, surgeon and zoologist (born 1815)

References

1880s in France